The US Center for Women in Law, set up and funded by women, says it is "devoted to the success of the entire spectrum of women in law ... serves as a national resource to convene leaders, generate ideas, and lead change".  It says that it combines theory with practice, addressing issues facing individuals and the profession as a whole. The Center is a Vision 2020 National Ally.

Founding 

The Center was founded in 2009 by a group of women, many of whom were alumnae of The University of Texas School of Law, and many of whom graduated from law school in earlier decades when it was not common for women to pursue law as a career.  The group began discussing the issues faced by women lawyers and became determined to understand fully and address effectively the underlying causes of the barriers to advancement faced by women lawyers. These early conversations ultimately led to the creation of the Center for Women in Law. The Founding Members provided the Center with initial funding toward its endowment, and the purpose to improve the status of all women in law.

Mission 
The Center's mission is to serve as a national resource to convene leaders, generate ideas, and lead change, and that it advocates for significant and lasting changes in the law and the practice by:

 building a national movement by facilitating strategic partnerships through its Consortium for Advancing Women Lawyers;
 providing leadership programs that position women lawyers for success at all stages in their careers;
 promoting best practices for advancing women in law firms, businesses, and other organizations;
 advocating for creative solutions that allow women to raise families while building legal careers;
 providing a center for academic research;
 serving as a resource to law firms, businesses, and other organizations across Texas and throughout the U.S.

The Austin Manifesto 
The Austin Manifesto  was adopted by acclamation at the 2009 Women's Power Summit on Law and Leadership™, sponsored by the Center for Women in Law at The University of Texas School of Law, on May 1, 2009.  The Austin Manifesto calls for specific, concrete steps to tackle the obstacles facing women in the legal profession today.  A priority of the Center is gathering information on the steps taken by the signatories and measuring progress pursuant to the Manifesto.

Consortium for Advancing Women Lawyers 
The Center created the Consortium for Advancing Women Lawyers, which provides the platform to support a national movement by bringing together thought leaders from across the country.  Through twice-annual meetings, the leaders share knowledge, develop synergies, and enhance efforts to advance women leaders in the legal profession.

The Women’s Power Summit on Law & Leadership™ 
The Women's Power Summit on Law and Leadership™ is a private three-day gathering of women in law, ranging from those at the highest echelons of private practice and the corporate sector to their counterparts in government, non-profits, academia, and the judiciary. The Women's Power Summit™ features speakers and panel discussions on a variety of topics affecting women within the legal profession.  Participants share information, assess the progress that has been made, identify the end goals, network, and set an agenda for future change. The Women's Power Summit™ has been held every two years since 2009.

References

External links 
 Center for Women in Law home page
 Center for Women in Law Founders
 The Austin Manifesto	

Legal organizations based in the United States